Qarqa may refer to:
 Qarqa, Hashtrud
 Qarqa, Sarab